William Henry Abstein (February 2, 1883 – April 8, 1940), nicknamed "Big Bill", was a professional baseball and amateur soccer player.  He played all or part of three seasons in Major League Baseball player, from 1906 to 1910, primarily as a first baseman. He played for the Pittsburgh Pirates and St. Louis Browns. He played in 170 games, with 150 hits, one home run, 76 RBI and a batting average of .242. He played for Pittsburgh during the 1909 World Series, appearing in all seven games and getting six hits. 

Abstein spent the 1904–05 St. Louis Association Foot Ball League season with Diel F.C. which was managed by Thomas Cahill.  He later played for Memphis Chicks in the Southern League.  During those years, he also played soccer as a midfielder for St. Leo's in the St. Louis Soccer League during the off-season.

References

External links

Soccer players from St. Louis
Major League Baseball infielders
Pittsburgh Pirates players
St. Louis Browns players
Houston Wanderers players
Shreveport Pirates (baseball) players
Providence Grays (minor league) players
Jersey City Skeeters players
Memphis Chickasaws players
Los Angeles Angels (minor league) players
Seattle Giants players
Wichita Witches players
Colorado Springs Millionaires players
Baseball players from St. Louis
St. Louis Soccer League players
St. Leo’s players
1883 births
1940 deaths
Association football midfielders
American men's soccer players